Politics of the British Virgin Islands takes place in a framework of a parliamentary representative democratic dependency, whereby the Premier is the head of government, and of a  multi-party system. The British Virgin Islands (officially the "Virgin Islands") are an internally self-governing overseas territory of the United Kingdom. The United Nations Committee on Decolonization includes the islands on the United Nations list of non-self-governing territories. The Constitution of the Islands was introduced in 1971 and amended in 1979, 1982, 1991, 1994, 2000 and 2007. Executive power is exercised by the government. Legislative power is vested in both the government and the House of Assembly. The Judiciary is independent of the executive and the legislature. Military defence is the responsibility of the United Kingdom.

A new constitution was made in 2007 (the Virgin Islands Constitution Order 2007) and came into force after the Legislative Council (the former name of the House of Assembly) was dissolved for the 2007 general election.

Executive branch

|King
|Charles III 
|
|8 September 2022
|-
|Governor
|John Rankin
|
|15 August 2014
|-
|Premier
|Natalio Wheatley
|VIP
|5 May 2022
|}
The Governor is appointed by the Monarch. The Premier (formerly Chief Minister) is appointed by the Governor from among the members of the Legislative Council, and is by parliamentary convention the leader of the party holding the largest number of seats.  

The Cabinet (formerly named the Executive Council) is appointed by the Governor upon the advice of the Premier from amongst the elected members of the House of Assembly.

Legislative branch

The British Virgin Islands elects on territorial level a legislature. The House of Assembly (formerly Legislative Council) has 15 members, 13 members elected for a four-year term, 9 of them in single-seat constituencies and 4 at large, one ex officio member and one speaker chosen from outside the council.

"At large" seats
The 4 at large seats are a comparatively recent innovation in British Virgin Islands politics.  They were introduced under some pressure from the British Foreign and Commonwealth Office in the mid-1990s.  The rationale behind their introduction was that there was a risk that constituency seats can become too closely tied to a particular local figure, and that if a certain number of local figures join the same political party, then the voters have no real choice in selection of their government.  Under the proposals any person in the Territory could stand as an at large candidate, and each voter would have four at large votes in addition to their constituency vote.  The four at large candidates who received the highest total number of votes would be elected to the Legislative Council.

The proposals were strongly opposed by Lavity Stoutt, the Chief Minister of the day; he arranged for the entire Territory to be polled to ascertain how the voters felt about new rules being "foisted" upon them by the FCO in London, and then later flew to London with an entire delegation (including the Attorney General) to try to dissuade them.  Despite this opposition the at large seats were introduced.

Although Lavity Stoutt died shortly after the first election with at large seats in 1995, his fears proved to be well founded.  Although his Virgin Islands Party was returned to power in 1995, and retained power in the following election under the leadership of Ralph T. O'Neal in 1999, the at-large seats have since become a stronghold for the opposition National Democratic Party.

List of Members

Political parties and elections

The two main political parties in the British Virgin Islands at present at the Virgin Islands Party (VIP) and the National Democratic Party (NDP).  The only parties other than the VIP and the NDP which has ever won power at a general election in the British Virgin Islands is the now defunct United Party, which won the 1967, 1975 and 1983 general elections, and the now defunct VI Democratic Party, which won the 1971 general election as part of a coalition government.

Political parties in the British Virgin Islands are not generally formed on an ideological basis, and do not normally affiliate themselves with a political school of thought.  Political parties do not identify themselves are being on the political right or the political left.  Similarly parties do not normally identify themselves with mainstream political movement such as green politics.  Although there are no religious parties in the British Virgin Islands, all parties typically identify themselves with Christianity.  Most parties campaign on a concepts with close affinity to nationalism, and core competency in relation to administration of Government.  Because of the high numbers of economic migrants in the British Virgin Islands, much political campaigning has a xenophobic tinge to it, and often focuses on political patronage for BVIslanders.

Crossing the floor
There is relatively little party loyalty in the British Virgin Islands (which may be reflective of the lack of party ideology), and most significant elected politicians have changed party allegiance at least once, and sometimes more frequently, during their careers.  Notable politicians who have switched parties include:

Judicial branch

The British Virgin Islands is a member state of the Eastern Caribbean Supreme Court.  Judges in the British Virgin Islands are appointed rather than elected politically.  By convention, judges on the Eastern Caribbean are always appointed to sit outside of the jurisdiction they are from to minimise the possibility of political interference with the judiciary.

International organization participation
Caricom (associate), CDB, ECLAC (associate), Interpol (subbureau), IOC, OECS (associate), UNESCO (associate)

Notes

Footnotes